The Country Attorney is a 1787 comic play by the British writer Richard Cumberland. It was first performed at the Haymarket Theatre on 7 July 1787. The play was reworked and much of it used again by Cumberland for the 1789 play The School for Widows.

References

Bibliography
 Nicoll, Allardyce. A History of English Drama 1660-1900. Volume III: Late Eighteenth Century Drama. Cambridge University Press, 1952.
 Watson, George. ''The New Cambridge Bibliography of English Literature: Volume 2, 1660-1800. Cambridge University Press, 1971.

Plays by Richard Cumberland
1787 plays
West End plays
Comedy plays